Maycock's Bay is located between Six Men's Bay and Harrison Point in St. Lucy, the northwest of Barbados. It is on the west coast of the island to the north. The area has multiple cliffs extending from Bird Rock to Archers Bay and from Stroud Bay to Maycocks Bay.

References

Bays of Barbados